{{Infobox person
| name = Henry Hübchen
| image = Henry Hubchen.jpg
| imagesize = 
| caption = Henry Hübchen in Karlovy Vary (2009)
| birth_date = 
| birth_name = Henry Hübchen
| birth_place = Berlin, Germany 
| years_active = 1971–present
| occupation = actor
| spouse = 
| awards = German Film Awards, Best Actor 2005 Alles auf Zucker!}}Henry Hübchen' (born 20 February 1947 in Berlin) is a German actor who played the title character in the award-winning 2004 film Go for Zucker. That performance earned him a Lola, Germany's equivalent of an Oscar,  and critical praise at home and abroad. He was raised in East Berlin, in what was then East Germany.

Praise for Zucker
Critic David Denby praised his performance in Zucker, writing "veteran German theater and film actor Henry Hübchen gives this middle-aged rogue a Bellovian gusto. Hübchen has the eyes of a gentle bull and a teenager's manic energy." The New York Times said the character, Jaeckie Zucker, "suggests a German Jewish Rodney Dangerfield in his gleeful boorishness."

Other work and background
In an August 2004 profile, German public broadcaster Mitteldeutscher Rundfunk said Hübchen is best known in Germany for a role on the long-running television series Polizeiruf 110. The profile says that before coming to film, he was a failed physics student, wrote songs for the East German rock group City and was twice East German windsurfing champion (in 1980 and 1981).

According to the article he studied drama in Berlin and Magdeburg. He won the Berlin Theater Award (Theaterpreis Berlin) in 2000.

He has two daughters, Theresa and Franziska, with his wife Sanna Hübchen.

Selected filmography
  (1993)
 The Big Mambo (1998)
  (1999, TV film)
 Sonnenallee (1999)
  (2001)
 Polizeiruf 110 (2003–2005, TV series, 5 episodes)
  (2004)
 Go for Zucker (2004)
  (2005, TV film)
 Mordshunger (2008, TV film)
  (2008)
  (2009)
 Lila, Lila (2009)
 Young Goethe in Love (2010)
  (2011)
  (2012)
  (2013)
 '' (2013)

References

External links 

Living people
1947 births
German male film actors
German male television actors
20th-century German male actors
21st-century German male actors
Male actors from Berlin
Ernst Busch Academy of Dramatic Arts alumni
German Film Award winners